Mark Newby (also known as Mark Newbie) was born in England and emigrated to Ireland due to religious persecution for his being a Quaker. Along with several other families he sailed to America landing in West New Jersey and settled in Camden, New Jersey.

He owned a tract of land and built a home establishing himself as a banker. He and/or some of the other settlers brought the St. Patrick halfpenny in sufficient quantity that he along with others received a grant to make these coins legal tender in the region on 18 May 1682.

Death
He died in 1683 in Camden, New Jersey.

References

Place of birth unknown
People from Camden, New Jersey
Year of birth unknown
1683 deaths
English Quakers
American Quakers
English emigrants
People of colonial New Jersey
Members of the West New Jersey Provincial Council